Robert Morley (1908–1992) was an English actor.

Robert Morley may also refer to:
 Robert Morley, 2nd Baron Morley, English naval officer
 Robert Morley, 6th Baron Morley (1418–1442), English baron
 Robert Morley (died 1632), English merchant and politician
 Robert Morley (trade unionist) (1863–1931), British trade unionist and politician
 Bob Morley (born 1984), Australian actor and television director